Thitarodes damxungensis is a species of moth of the family Hepialidae. It was described by D.R. Yang in 1995, and is known from the Tibet Autonomous Region in China.

References

External links
Hepialidae genera

Moths described in 1995
Hepialidae